Clunio is a genus of non-biting midges in the subfamily Orthocladiinae of the bloodworm family (Chironomidae). All species in the genus are marine. They are found in the intertidal zone of many coasts worldwide. The species Clunio marinus is a long-standing model system in Chronobiology and its genome has been sequenced. Clunio species can be dispersed widely by hitch-hiking on sea-turtles, feeding on algae growing on their carapace.

Species
C. adriaticus Schiner 1856
C. africanus  Hesse 1937
C. aquilonius  Tokinaga 1938
C. balticus Heimbach 1978
C. brasiliensis Oliviera 1950
C. brevis Stone and Wirth 1947
C. californiensis Hashimoto 1974
C. fuscipennis Wirth 1952
C. littoralis Stone and Wirth 1947
C. marinus Haliday 1855
C. marshalli Stone and Wirth 1947
C. mediterraneus Neumann 1966
C. pacificus Edwards 1926
C. ponticus Michailova 1980
C. purpureus  Hashimoto 1962
C. schmitti Stone and Wirth 1947
C. setoensis Tokunaga 1933
C. takahashii Tokunaga 1938
C. tsushimensis Tokunaga 1933
C. tuthilli Tokunaga 1964
C. vagans Stone & Wirth 1947

References

Chironomidae
Nematocera genera
Taxa named by Alexander Henry Haliday
Marine insects